An amoeba (less commonly spelled ameba or amœba; plural am(o)ebas or am(o)ebae ), often called an amoeboid, is a type of cell or unicellular organism with the ability to alter its shape, primarily by extending and retracting pseudopods. Amoebae do not form a single taxonomic group; instead, they are found in every major lineage of eukaryotic organisms. Amoeboid cells occur not only among the protozoa, but also in fungi, algae, and animals.

Microbiologists often use the terms "amoeboid" and "amoeba" interchangeably for any organism that exhibits amoeboid movement.

In older classification systems, most amoebae were placed in the class or subphylum Sarcodina, a grouping of single-celled organisms that possess pseudopods or move by protoplasmic flow. However, molecular phylogenetic studies have shown that Sarcodina is not a monophyletic group whose members share common descent. Consequently, amoeboid organisms are no longer classified together in one group.

The best known amoeboid protists are Chaos carolinense and Amoeba proteus, both of which have been widely cultivated and studied in classrooms and laboratories. Other well known species include the so-called "brain-eating amoeba" Naegleria fowleri, the intestinal parasite Entamoeba histolytica, which causes amoebic dysentery, and the multicellular "social amoeba" or slime mould Dictyostelium discoideum.

Shape, movement and nutrition

Amoeba do not have cell walls, which allows for free movement. Amoeba move and feed by using pseudopods, which are bulges of cytoplasm formed by the coordinated action of actin microfilaments pushing out the plasma membrane that surrounds the cell. The appearance and internal structure of pseudopods are used to distinguish groups of amoebae from one another. Amoebozoan species, such as those in the genus Amoeba, typically have bulbous (lobose) pseudopods, rounded at the ends and roughly tubular in cross-section. Cercozoan amoeboids, such as Euglypha and Gromia, have slender, thread-like (filose) pseudopods. Foraminifera emit fine, branching pseudopods that merge with one another to form net-like (reticulose) structures. Some groups, such as the Radiolaria and Heliozoa, have stiff, needle-like, radiating axopodia (actinopoda) supported from within by bundles of microtubules.

Free-living amoebae may be "testate" (enclosed within a hard shell), or "naked" (also known as gymnamoebae, lacking any hard covering). The shells of testate amoebae may be composed of various substances, including calcium, silica, chitin, or agglutinations of found materials like small grains of sand and the frustules of diatoms.

To regulate osmotic pressure, most freshwater amoebae have a contractile vacuole which expels excess water from the cell. This organelle is necessary because freshwater has a lower concentration of solutes (such as salt) than the amoeba's own internal fluids (cytosol). Because the surrounding water is hypotonic with respect to the contents of the cell, water is transferred across the amoeba's cell membrane by osmosis. Without a contractile vacuole, the cell would fill with excess water and, eventually, burst. Marine amoebae do not usually possess a contractile vacuole because the concentration of solutes within the cell are in balance with the tonicity of the surrounding water.

Diet

The food sources of amoebae vary. Some amoebae are predatory and live by consuming bacteria and other protists. Some are detritivores and eat dead organic material.

Amoebae typically ingest their food by phagocytosis, extending pseudopods to encircle and engulf live prey or particles of scavenged material. Amoeboid cells do not have a mouth or cytostome, and there is no fixed place on the cell at which phagocytosis normally occurs.

Some amoebae also feed by pinocytosis, imbibing dissolved nutrients through vesicles formed within the cell membrane.

Size range

The size of amoeboid cells and species is extremely variable. The marine amoeboid Massisteria voersi is just 2.3 to 3 micrometres in diameter, within the size range of many bacteria. At the other extreme, the shells of deep-sea xenophyophores can attain 20 cm in diameter. Most of the free-living freshwater amoebae commonly found in pond water, ditches, and lakes are microscopic, but some species, such as the so-called "giant amoebae" Pelomyxa palustris and Chaos carolinense, can be large enough to see with the naked eye.

Amoebae as specialized cells and life cycle stages

Some multicellular organisms have amoeboid cells only in certain phases of life, or use amoeboid movements for specialized functions. In the immune system of humans and other animals, amoeboid white blood cells pursue invading organisms, such as bacteria and pathogenic protists, and engulf them by phagocytosis.

Amoeboid stages also occur in the multicellular fungus-like protists, the so-called slime moulds. Both the plasmodial slime moulds, currently classified in the class Myxogastria, and the cellular slime moulds of the groups Acrasida and Dictyosteliida, live as amoebae during their feeding stage. The amoeboid cells of the former combine to form a giant multinucleate organism, while the cells of the latter live separately until food runs out, at which time the amoebae aggregate to form a multicellular migrating "slug" which functions as a single organism.

Other organisms may also present amoeboid cells during certain life-cycle stages, e.g., the gametes of some green algae (Zygnematophyceae) and pennate diatoms, the spores (or dispersal phases) of some Mesomycetozoea, and the sporoplasm stage of Myxozoa and of Ascetosporea.

Amoebae as organisms

Early history and origins of Sarcodina

The earliest record of an amoeboid organism was produced in 1755 by August Johann Rösel von Rosenhof, who named his discovery "Der Kleine Proteus" ("the Little Proteus"). Rösel's illustrations show an unidentifiable freshwater amoeba, similar in appearance to the common species now known as Amoeba proteus. The term "Proteus animalcule" remained in use throughout the 18th and 19th centuries, as an informal name for any large, free-living amoeboid.

In 1822, the genus Amiba (from the Greek ἀμοιβή amoibe, meaning "change") was erected by the French naturalist Bory de Saint-Vincent. Bory's contemporary, C. G. Ehrenberg, adopted the genus in his own classification of microscopic creatures, but changed the spelling to Amoeba.

In 1841, Félix Dujardin coined the term "sarcode" (from Greek σάρξ sarx, "flesh," and εἶδος eidos, "form") for the "thick, glutinous, homogeneous substance" which fills protozoan cell bodies. Although the term originally referred to the protoplasm of any protozoan, it soon came to be used in a restricted sense to designate the gelatinous contents of amoeboid cells. Thirty years later, the Austrian zoologist Ludwig Karl Schmarda used "sarcode" as the conceptual basis for his division Sarcodea, a phylum-level group made up of "unstable, changeable" organisms with bodies largely composed of "sarcode". Later workers, including the influential taxonomist Otto Bütschli, amended this group to create the class Sarcodina, a taxon that remained in wide use throughout most of the 20th century.

Within the traditional Sarcodina, amoebae were generally divided into morphological categories, on the basis of the form and structure of their pseudopods. Amoebae with pseudopods supported by regular arrays of microtubules (such as the freshwater Heliozoa and marine Radiolaria) were classified as Actinopoda; whereas those with unsupported pseudopods were classified as Rhizopoda. The Rhizopods were further subdivided into lobose, filose, and reticulose amoebae, according to the morphology of their pseudopods.

Dismantling of Sarcodina
In the final decade of the 20th century, a series of molecular phylogenetic analyses confirmed that Sarcodina was not a monophyletic group. In view of these findings, the old scheme was abandoned and the amoebae of Sarcodina were dispersed among many other high-level taxonomic groups. Today, the majority of traditional sarcodines are placed in two eukaryote supergroups: Amoebozoa and Rhizaria. The rest have been distributed among the excavates, opisthokonts, and stramenopiles. Some, like the Centrohelida, have yet to be placed in any supergroup.

Classification
Recent classification places the various amoeboid genera in the following groups:

Some of the amoeboid groups cited (e.g., part of chrysophytes, part of xanthophytes, chlorarachniophytes) were not traditionally included in Sarcodina, being classified as algae or flagellated protozoa.

Pathogenic interactions with other organisms

Some amoebae can infect other organisms pathogenically, causing disease:

Entamoeba histolytica is the cause of amoebiasis, or amoebic dysentery.
Naegleria fowleri (the "brain-eating amoeba") is a fresh-water-native species that can be fatal to humans if introduced through the nose.
Acanthamoeba can cause amoebic keratitis and encephalitis in humans.
Balamuthia mandrillaris is the cause of (often fatal) granulomatous amoebic meningoencephalitis.

Amoeba have been found to harvest and grow the bacteria implicated in plague. Amoebae can likewise play host to microscopic organisms that are pathogenic to people and help in spreading such microbes. Bacterial pathogens (for example, Legionella) can oppose absorption of food when devoured by amoebae.
The currently generally utilized and best-explored amoebae that host other organisms are Acanthamoeba castellanii and Dictyostelium discoideum.
Microorganisms that can overcome the defenses of one-celled organisms can shelter and multiply inside them, where they are shielded from unfriendly outside conditions by their hosts.

Meiosis
Recent evidence indicates that several Amoebozoa lineages undergo meiosis.

Orthologs of genes employed in meiosis of sexual eukaryotes have recently been identified in the Acanthamoeba genome. These genes included Spo11, Mre11, Rad50, Rad51, Rad52, Mnd1, Dmc1, Msh and Mlh. This finding suggests that the ‘'Acanthamoeba'’ are capable of some form of meiosis and may be able to undergo sexual reproduction.

The meiosis-specific recombinase, Dmc1, is required for efficient meiotic homologous recombination, and Dmc1 is expressed in Entamoeba histolytica. The purified Dmc1 from E. histolytica forms presynaptic filaments and catalyses ATP-dependent homologous DNA pairing and DNA strand exchange over at least several thousand base pairs. The DNA pairing and strand exchange reactions are enhanced by the eukaryotic meiosis-specific recombination accessory factor (heterodimer) Hop2-Mnd1. These processes are central to meiotic recombination, suggesting that E. histolytica undergoes meiosis.

Studies of Entamoeba invadens found that, during the conversion from the tetraploid uninucleate trophozoite to the tetranucleate cyst, homologous recombination is enhanced. Expression of genes with functions related to the major steps of meiotic recombination also increase during encystations. These findings in E. invadens, combined with evidence from studies of E. histolytica indicate the presence of meiosis in the Entamoeba.

Dictyostelium discoideum in the supergroup Amoebozoa can undergo mating and sexual reproduction including meiosis when food is scarce.

Since the Amoebozoa diverged early from the eukaryotic family tree, these results suggest that meiosis was present early in eukaryotic evolution. Furthermore, these findings are consistent with the proposal of Lahr et al. that the majority of amoeboid lineages are anciently sexual.

References

Further reading
Walochnik, J. & Aspöck, H. (2007). Amöben: Paradebeispiele für Probleme der Phylogenetik, Klassifikation und Nomenklatur. Denisia 20: 323–350. (In German)
Amoebae: Protists Which Move and Feed Using Pseudopodia at the Tree of Life web project
 Pawlowski, J. & Burki, F. (2009). Untangling the Phylogeny of Amoeboid Protists. Journal of Eukaryotic Microbiology 56.1: 16–25.

External links

 Siemensma, F. Microworld: world of amoeboid organisms.
 Völcker, E. & Clauß, S. Visual key to amoeboid morphotypes. Penard Labs.
The Amoebae website of Maciver Lab of the University of Edinburgh, brings together information from published sources.
Molecular Expressions Digital Video Gallery: Pond Life – Amoeba (Protozoa) – informative amoeba videos

Cell biology
Motile cells